Dorben Polytechnic (formerly Abuja School of Accountancy and Computer Studies-ASACS) has its main campus located in Garam, Niger State, Nigeria, and another campus just to the north in Suleja, Niger State. It is usually addressed as Dorben Polytechnic (Bwari) Abuja, since it originally had its main campus in Bwari, Abuja (and which is where the process of accreditation started). Privately owned, the polytechnic provides training leading to the award of National Diploma (ND) and Higher National Diploma (HND) programs for students who intend to work as accountants, computer specialists, administrators, and managers.

History 
It was incorporated in 1995 and was approved and accredited as a school by the National Board for Technical Education and the Nigerian Federal Ministry of Education in 1999. Starting with just 250 students, as of 2010 Dorben had more than 3500 students and over 45 faculty members. Before being accredited as a polytechnic in 2007, the school had to acquire 50 hectares of land and have a minimum of one hundred million naira bank guarantee and mount core engineering programs.

In September 2008 the National Association of Nigerian Students bestowed an award of Excellence on the chairman of the management board of the Dorben Polytechnic, Dr. A.B. Ekwere.
Speaking in October 2009, Ekwere said that four lecturers who had been sacked for examination malpractices were seeking the help of local chiefs to beg for their reinstatement. He was not sympathetic, and said that the institution made every effort to prevent cheating on exams.

Schools 
The institution has the following programmes;

School of Business Studies

 Business Administration and Management
 Accountancy
 Office Technology and Management
 Public Administration
 Mass Communication

School of Natural and Applied Sciences

 Mathematics and Statistics
 Science Laboratory Technology
 Computer Science
 Hospitality Management

School of Engineering and Environmental Studies

 Electrical/Electronic Engineering
 Computer Engineering technology
 Urban and Regional Planning
 Estate Management

See also
 List of polytechnics in Nigeria

References

Universities and colleges in Nigeria
Education in Niger State
1995 establishments in Nigeria
Educational institutions established in 1995